St Mary's Church, Bramall Lane is a Church of England parish church in the City of Sheffield, England.

History
St Mary's Church is one of three churches that were built in Sheffield under the Church Building Act 1818 (the other two being St George's Church, Portobello and St Philip's Church, Netherthorpe), and is the only one still to be used as a church. The church was designed by Joseph Potter and cost £13,927. A grant of £13,941 was received from the Church Building Commission to cover the cost of building and other expenses.  The foundation stone was laid on 12 October 1826 by the Countess of Surrey, and the church was consecrated on 21 July 1830.

In 1839 some Chartists, suspicious of the big new Anglican churches, unsuccessfully attempted to fire-bomb St Mary's.

It is recorded in the National Heritage List for England as a designated grade II* listed building.

Present day
In 2000, a major internal refurbishment took place resulting in the church and community centre becoming a combined space. The space is also used to host conferences.

There are close links between the church and Sheffield United F.C., whose ground is situated on Bramall Lane.  During the refurbishment in 2000, church services took place at the football club.

See also
Listed buildings in Sheffield
List of Commissioners' churches in Yorkshire

References

External links
Official website

Churches completed in 1830
Bramall Lane, Saint Marys Church
Grade II* listed buildings in Sheffield
Bramall Lane, Saint Marys Church
Bramall Lane, Saint Marys Church
Commissioners' church buildings
Grade II* listed churches in South Yorkshire
1830 establishments in England